Frankluquetia inexpectata is a species of beetle in the family Cerambycidae, and the only species in the genus Frankluquetia. It was described by Tavakilian in 2003.

References

Hemilophini
Beetles described in 2003